Federico Gonzaga may refer to:

 Federico I Gonzaga, Marquess of Mantua (1441–1484), Marquess of Mantua, 1478–1484
 Federico II Gonzaga, Duke of Mantua (1500–1540), ruler of the Italian city of Mantua
 Federico Gonzaga (cardinal) (1540–1565), his son, Italian Roman Catholic Cardinal and Bishop